Thomas "Nephew Tommy" Miles is an American comedian, actor and producer. He currently co-hosts The Steve Harvey Morning Show during which he frequently makes prank phone calls. He is the nephew of comedian Steve Harvey, which is where his stage name comes from.

Education
Nephew Tommy studied theatre at Texas A&M University.

Discography
Nephew Tommy's Prank Phone Calls: Volume 1
Nephew Tommy's Prank Phone Calls: Volume 2
The Best of Nephew Tommy's Prank Phone Calls: Volume 3
Nephew Tommy's Prank Phone Calls: Volume 4
Nephew Tommy's Prank Phone Calls: Volume 5 - Church Folks Gotta Laugh Too!
Nephew Tommy's Prank Phone Calls: Volume 6 - Cheaters
Nephew Tommy's Celebrity Prank Phone Calls
Nephew Tommy's Lost Prank Phone Calls: Part 1
Nephew Tommy's Lost Prank Phone Calls: Part 2
Won’t He Do It

See also
 List of Kappa Alpha Psi brothers

References

External links

Nephew Tommy on Twitter

African-American male comedians
American male comedians
21st-century American comedians
American male film actors
African-American male actors
African-American stand-up comedians
American stand-up comedians
American radio personalities
American television personalities
Male television personalities
Living people
Male actors from Houston
Texas A&M University alumni
American male stage actors
1967 births
21st-century African-American people
20th-century African-American people